Saint-Louis University may refer to:
 Saint-Louis University, Brussels (UCLouvain), a research university in Brussels, Belgium
 Saint Louis University (SLU), a research university in St. Louis, Missouri
 Saint Louis University (SLU), a university in Baguio City, Philippines